Pussy Gold 5000 is an EP by American noise rock band Pussy Galore, released in January 1987 by Shove Records.

Track listing

Personnel
Adapted from the Pussy Gold 5000 liner notes.

Pussy Galore
 Bob Bert – drums, percussion
 Julie Cafritz – electric guitar, vocals
 Neil Hagerty – electric guitar, organ, vocals
 Cristina Martinez – electric guitar, organ
 Jon Spencer – lead vocals, electric guitar, percussion

Additional musicians
 John Hammill – drums (B3)
 Tom Raferty – percussion (B3)
Production and additional personnel
 Chris Gehringer – mastering
 Karl Peterson – photography
 Pussy Galore – production
 Wharton Tiers – recording

Release history

References

External links 
 

1987 EPs
Pussy Galore (band) albums
Albums produced by Wharton Tiers